Tun Pehin Sri Datuk Patinggi Abang Haji Muhammad Salahuddin bin Abang Barieng (né Louis anak Barieng; ; 27 August 1921 – 28 January 2022) was a Malaysian politician who served as the third Yang di-Pertua Negeri of Sarawak from 1977 to 1981, and as the sixth Yang di-Pertua Negeri from 2001 to 2014. He was the first Yang di-Pertua Negeri to hold the post twice, as well as the oldest elected to the office.

Early life
Born in 1921 at Kampung Nangka, Sibu, Raj of Sarawak (present-day Sarawak, Malaysia) Abang Muhammad Salahuddin, or Abang Louis, was the only son of Abang Barieng Abang Anyut, a well-known figure in the Third Division (present-day Sibu Division), who had a bloodline with famous state leader Temenggung Jugah Barieng. Abang Louis later changed his name to his Islam one after his conversion.

After the Japanese occupation, he worked as Municipal Inspector until 1947 under the new British colonial administration. He continued in the public service under the National Registration Department and the Public Works Department.

Political career
Salahuddin was active in state politics, helping to form Barisan Pemuda Sarawak (BPS) and Barisan Rakyat Jati Sarawak (BARJASA). He acted as representative of the Melanau community to the Cobbold Commission during the years preceding the formation of Malaysia.

In 1963, he contested and won a seat in the state elections. He resigned in 1968 and returned to public service and eventually became Chairman of the State Public Service Commission.

Governorship
In 1977, he was installed as the third Yang di-Pertua Negeri of Sarawak and served for his first term. In 2000, he became the acting Yang di-Pertua Negeri while his successor Ahmad Zaidi Adruce was ill. Ahmad Zaidi died in December 2000, and Abang Muhammad Salahuddin was reappointed permanently to the governorship in February 2001, and his term officially ended on 28 February 2014.

Death 
Salahuddin died at the Normah Sarawak Medical Centre in Petra Jaya, on 28 January 2022, at the age of 100. He was buried at the Samariang Muslim Cemetery in Kuching.

Honours

Honours of Malaysia 
  :
  Grand Commander of the Order of the Defender of the Realm (SMN) – Tun (1978)
  :
 Knight Grand Commander of the Most Exalted Order of the Star of Sarawak (SBS) – Pehin Sri (2017)
 Knight Grand Commander of the Order of the Star of Hornbill Sarawak (DP) – Datuk Patinggi
  Grand Master of the Order of Meritorious Service to Sarawak (JBS)
  Grand Master of the Most Exalted Order of the Star of Sarawak (PPA)
  :
  Grand Commander of the Premier and Exalted Order of Malacca (DUNM) – Datuk Seri Utama
  :
  Knight Grand Commander of the Order of the Defender of State (DUPN) – Dato' Seri Utama
  : 
  Knight Grand Commander of the Order of the Crown of Perlis (SPMP) – Dato' Seri (1979)
  :
  Grand Commander of the Order of Kinabalu (SPDK) – Datuk Seri Panglima

References

Notes
 Who's who 82/83 (First Edition), Sarawak Publishing House Sdn.Bhd., Kuching, Malaysia.

1921 births
2022 deaths
People from Sarawak
Melanau people
Malaysian centenarians
Men centenarians
Yang di-Pertua Negeri of Sarawak
Malaysian politicians

Knights Grand Commander of the Most Exalted Order of the Star of Sarawak
Grand Commanders of the Order of the Defender of the Realm
Knights Grand Commander of the Order of the Star of Hornbill Sarawak
Grand Commanders of the Order of Kinabalu